Magdalena "Magda" Amo Rius (born 23 July 1973) is a paralympic athlete from Spain competing mainly in category F10-11 long jump events.

Magdalena competed in the 1992 Summer Paralympics where she failed to finish the 200m but finished second in the long jump behind Raisa Zhuravleva who set a new games record.  She returned for the 1996 Summer Paralympics concentrating on the long jump and it paid off as Magdalena came away with the gold medal in a new Paralympic record beating compatriot Rosalia Lazaro on count back with compatriot Purificacion Ortiz completing the Spanish clean sweep of medals.

Notes

References

External links 
 
 

1973 births
Living people
Spanish female sprinters
Spanish female long jumpers
Paralympic athletes of Spain
Paralympic gold medalists for Spain
Paralympic silver medalists for Spain
Paralympic medalists in athletics (track and field)
Athletes (track and field) at the 1992 Summer Paralympics
Athletes (track and field) at the 1996 Summer Paralympics
Medalists at the 1992 Summer Paralympics
Medalists at the 1996 Summer Paralympics
Visually impaired sprinters
Visually impaired long jumpers
Paralympic sprinters
Paralympic long jumpers